William Benjamin Davis, Jr. (born June 2, 1986) is a former American football defensive end. He was drafted by the Arizona Cardinals in the sixth round of the 2009 NFL Draft. He played college football at Illinois.

Early years
He played high school football at Eleanor Roosevelt High School in Greenbelt, Maryland.

Professional career

Arizona Cardinals
Drafted 3 round pick 104

New Orleans Saints
He was signed Septerpber 3, 2013

Saskatchewan Roughriders
He was signed on March 15, 2015.

References

External links
 Illinois Fighting Illini bio

1986 births
Living people
People from Greenbelt, Maryland
Players of American football from Maryland
African-American players of American football
American football defensive ends
American football outside linebackers
Illinois Fighting Illini football players
Arizona Cardinals players
Saskatchewan Roughriders players
Sportspeople from the Washington metropolitan area
American players of Canadian football
21st-century African-American sportspeople
20th-century African-American people